Shakhovskaya is an urban locality (a work settlement) and the administrative center of Shakhovskoy District of Moscow Oblast, Russia, located on the Izel and the Khovanka Rivers,  from Moscow. Population:  Postal code: 143700. Dialing code: +7 49637. Municipally, it is incorporated as Shakhovskaya Urban Settlement.

Shakhovskaya was founded in 1901 during the construction of the Moscow-Vindava railroad. It became the administrative center of the district on August 4, 1929, when Moscow Oblast was founded, and was granted urban-type settlement status in 1958.

Shakhovskaya stands on the M9 highway (Moscow–Riga) and the Moscow–Riga railway, being the terminus of suburban trains from Moscow.

References

Urban-type settlements in Moscow Oblast
Populated places established in 1901